Burundi requires its residents to register their motor vehicles and display vehicle registration plates. Current plates are European standard 520 mm × 110 mm, and use Belgian stamping dies.

References

Burundi
Transport in Burundi
Burundi transport-related lists